Asarwa is a district of Ahmedabad, India.  It is divided into two parts, New Asarwa and Old Asarwa. New Asawa contains more newly developed residential areas while Old Asarwa is a small village, and contains several manufacturing and weaving industries.

Among the tourist destinations located here are the Nilakanth Mahadev temple, an old temple and Mata Bhavani's Stepwell, while Asarwa village can be visited to have an insight of village life. 

Two major hospitals, Dendal Hospital and M.B. Shah Cancer Hospital, are situated here.

Accessibility 
Asarwa is located about 7 km from airport and 4 km from Ahmedabad Railway Station. Hanumansingh Road and M. Mukhi Road are two connecting roads in the region.

References

Neighbourhoods in Ahmedabad